Arshad Khan (born 22 March 1971) is a Pakistani cricket coach and former cricketer who is the current bowling coach of Pakistan women's cricket team. He was a right-handed batsman and a right-arm off break bowler.

Arshad was first picked to play against the West Indies during the 1997–98 season, and the following year, was part of the team which won the Asian Test Championship at Dhaka against Sri Lanka. He captained Pakistan in the 1998 Commonwealth Games Kuala Lumpur. He was a regular inclusion in the Pakistani side until 2001.

Four years later, a strong performance in the Pakistani domestic championship meant that Arshad earned a recall for Pakistan's 2005 tour of India. He performed credibly, particularly in the Bangalore Test, which Pakistan won in the last session to draw the series.

He toured the Caribbean in May 2005, and has retained his place for the upcoming England series.

During the 2005 One Day International series against England, Arshad was used in the second and fifth matches and proved effective at repressing the England batsmen, allowing very few runs to be scored off him and also taking wickets. During the fifth match, his economy was just over 3 runs per over – a very good figure for any bowler, especially a spinner.

A tall man at 6'4", Arshad bowls in a classical off-spinner's mould, preferring a nagging line to any great variation.

On 12 November 2020, he was appointed as bowling coach of Pakistan women's national cricket team.

References 

1971 births
Living people
Pakistan One Day International cricketers
Pakistan Test cricketers
ICL Pakistan XI cricketers
Lahore Badshahs cricketers
Cricketers at the 1998 Commonwealth Games
Pakistani cricketers
Allied Bank Limited cricketers
Karachi Blues cricketers
Pakistan National Shipping Corporation cricketers
Pakistan Customs cricketers
Pakistani emigrants to Australia
Islamabad cricketers
Khan Research Laboratories cricketers
Lahore Blues cricketers
Abbottabad cricketers
Cricketers from Peshawar
Pakistani cricket coaches
Pakistani taxi drivers
Commonwealth Games competitors for Pakistan